Guînes is a commune in the northern French department of Pas-de-Calais. Historically it was spelt Guisnes.

On 7 January 1785, Jean-Pierre Blanchard, a French pioneer in hydrogen-balloon flight, completed the first crossing of the English Channel, landing in the woods south of Guînes where a memorial column stands today.

Geography
Guînes is located on the border of the two territories of the Boulonnais and Calaisis, at the edge of the now-drained marshes, which extend from there to the coast. The Guînes canal connects with Calais.

History

Historically, Guînes was the capital of a small county of the same name.

After the Romans left, in the 5th century, there is little known about the town. In the Dark Ages, according to legend, the territory of Guînes became the property of one Aigneric, Mayor of the Palace of the Burgundian king Théodebert II.

In 928, when the Danes invaded and seized the place, it was probably a defenceless village. A fenced mound and a double ditch would soon have been created by the Danes. This is the origin of the castle of Guînes. Arnulf I, Count of Flanders, realizing a counter-attack would be costly, arranged the marriage of his daughter Elstrude, to Sigfrid, the Danish leader, bestowing upon him the title of Count of Guînes but as vassal to him, the Count of Flanders. Under Sigfrid's successors, the county of Guînes acquired considerable importance.

At the beginning of the 11th century, Count Manassès founded a convent of the order of Saint-Benoit. This was placed under the jurisdiction of the nearby abbey of Saint Léonard. At that time, Guînes comprised three parishes within its walls, whose churches were dedicated to Saint Bertin, Saint Pierre and Saint Médard. Outside the town ramparts were the abbey of Saint Léonard, the church of Saint-Blaise, in the hamlet of Melleke, and the leper-house of Saint Quentin, in the hamlet of Spelleke (in Tournepuits).

At the end of the 11th century, Baldwin II built a huge stone castle on top of Sigfrid's old keep and enclosed the town within a stone wall, with defensive towers at each of the entrances. His brother Fulk was a participant in the First Crusade.

On 22 January 1351, three years after the capture of Calais by Edward III, the castle of Guînes was also delivered up to the English. In 1360, the Treaty of Brétigny surrendered the city and its county to England and they eventually became part of the Pale of Calais, the last English possession in mainland France. The "Field of the Cloth of Gold", where Henry VIII of England and Francis I of France met in 1520, was at Balinghem in the immediate neighbourhood.

When the French captured the town of Calais in January 1558, Guînes held out, by the courageous efforts of the English commander, William Grey, 13th Baron Grey de Wilton. After a few days of desperate fighting, however, Grey was wounded and his soldiers refused to fight on. The French gave honourable terms of surrender and English rule of the area came to an end.

Population
The inhabitants are called Guinois.

Places and monuments

Blanchard's Column

On May 25, 1785, a column was erected to commemorate Jean-Pierre Blanchard's crossing of the English Channel by hydrogen balloon on 7 January 1785.

See also
Communes of the Pas-de-Calais department

Notes

References

External links

 Statistical data, INSEE

Communes of Pas-de-Calais
Pale of Calais